You Can Dance was a German televised dance competition based on the format of the international So You Think You Can Dance television franchise.  Hosted by Anna Maier, the show broadcast a single season in 2006/2007, crowning ballroom dancer Dennis Jauch as champion in its finale.

Top 14 finalists
 Ricarda Stürmer
 Sarah Hammerschmidt
 Marita Pohle
 Yasemin Celikkan
 Nicole Sommer
 Eva Nitsch
 Dorina Djouglarska
 Robin Grimm
 Jimmie Surles
 Camillo Lauricella
 Kim Willecke
 Christopher Jonas
 Cale Stanojevic

Judges panel
Julie Pecquet
Kelechi Onyele
Paul Kribbe
Dirk Elwert

Choreographers
Marvin A. Smith
Nina Uszkureit
Emile Moise
Nadine Wegner
Marco da Silva
Aziz Khadjeh-Nouri
Olando Amoo

See also
Dance on television

References

Germany
2010 German television series debuts
2010 German television series endings
German-language television shows
Sat.1 original programming
German television series based on American television series